Tamsin Pickeral (née Hughes; born 1971) is a British author and art historian who is best known for her art books and her books on animals and privately ordered books.
She is also working in marketing sphere.

Early life
Pickeral is the daughter of veterinary surgeon John Hughes MRCVS and artist/art teacher Valorie Jervis (née Rochfort-Hyde; granddaughter to Gustavus Rochfort Wade, High Sheriff of Westmeath, Éire ), and was brought up in an environment that greatly influenced her later career. Following school she won a scholarship to study history of art in Italy, before entering Reading University, Berks to study history of art and architecture. Throughout her school and university years, Pickeral rode horses competitively, eventing and showjumping in her free time with some success. Horses have continued to play a significant role in her life.

After graduating from university with an honours degree in the history of art and architecture, Pickeral travelled extensively, partially funded through the sale of a horse. On her return to the UK she worked for a short period of time in the travel industry, based in London, which indirectly led to a trip to Wyoming, USA. Pickeral married and remained in the US for eight years, spending the majority of this time living in relative isolation on a cattle ranch.

Writing career
She wrote her first book, The Encyclopedia of Horses and Ponies, Parragon, 1999 while in the US and shortly afterwards began extensive research into the history of the horse in art, while also working as a freelance writer. At this time she was further employed as a veterinary nurse at the Big Horn Veterinary Hospital, Buffalo, Wyoming.

On her return to the UK in 2004 Pickeral was able to devote herself full-time to her writing career, and since then has been the author or co-author of over twenty books covering the arts, horses and travel. In 2006 her book The Horse: 30,000 Years Of The Horse in Art was published by Merrell, and received extensive and favourable coverage in the national press. The book was chosen as The Guardian Book of the Week. Her book The Dog: 5,000 Years Of The Dog in Art, Merrell was published in 2008, again to critical acclaim and was voted into the Financial Times Top Fifty Art Books for that year and the Sunday Times Books of the Year – Art.

Pickeral’s most recent publications are The Majesty of the Horse (Harper Collins UK, Barrons Educational Series US) and The Spirit of the Dog (Frances Lincoln UK, Barrons Educational Series US) both 2012. In May 2010 the author wrote the first monograph based on leading British figurative painter Chris Gollon, titled, Chris Gollon: Humanity in Art.
Pickeral’s books are published internationally.

Selected publications
The Spirit of the Dog (2012)
The Majesty of the Horse (2011 US, 2012 UK)
Monet (2011)
Chris Gollon: Humanity in Art (2010)
Budget Horse And Pony Care: Cost Effective Horse Management (2009)
The Dog: 5,000 Years Of The Dog In Art (2008)
The Horse Lover’s Bible: The Complete Practical Guide To Horse Care And Management (2008)
Van Gogh (2007)
The Horse: 30,000 Years Of The Horse In Art (2006)Mackintosh (The World’s Greatest Art) (2005)Turner, Whistler, Monet ''(2005)

References

External links
 Tamsin Pickeral’s official website
 Pickeral on Chris Gollon’s website
 Pickeral on IAP Fine Art
 Interview with Pickeral on Dogcast radio
 Pickeral on Merrell Publishers.com
 Works by Tamsin Pickeral in libraries (WorldCat catalog)

British writers
Living people
1971 births